Muhammad Rafiuddin bin Roddin (born 22 August 1989 in Tawau) is a Malaysian footballer who plays for Malaysia Super League club Kuching City as a left-back. He also can plays as a winger.

Club career

Perak FC
Rafiuddin signed a contract with Perak FC on loan from his former team Harimau Muda A in August 2011 for Perak's Malaysia Cup campaign. After with his impressive performance during the Malaysia Cup campaign,  his move was made permanent for the 2012 season, along with other loanee Failee Ghazli.

After three seasons playing for Penang FC, Rafiuddin returned to Perak FC for 2018 season as a permanent transfer.

Career statistics

Club

Honours

Club
Penang
Malaysia Premier League: Promotion 2015

References

External links
 

Malaysian footballers
Perak F.C. players
Penang F.C. players
1989 births
Living people
People from Sabah
Association football midfielders